Sibley Triangle Building is a historic commercial building located at Rochester in Monroe County, New York. It is a five-story, triangular, flat-iron shaped, brick commercial building with Indiana limestone and marble trim on the first two stories. It was built in 1897 and is a distinguished example of eclectic Italian Renaissance style architecture. It was designed by noted Rochester architect J. Foster Warner and built for Hiram W. Sibley, a son of Hiram Sibley.

It was listed on the National Register of Historic Places in 1985.

References

Commercial buildings in Rochester, New York
Commercial buildings on the National Register of Historic Places in New York (state)
Commercial buildings completed in 1897
National Register of Historic Places in Rochester, New York

Triangular buildings